Meet the Parents is a hidden camera comedy game show that aired on E4 from 10 November 2010 to 17 October 2012. It was narrated by Ed Hall for series 1, then Alex Zane took over as presenter for series 2.

Transmissions

International versions
Starting October 15, 2016, these are the international adaptations from Meet the Parents.

External links
 
 
 
 

2010s British comedy television series
2010s British game shows
2010 British television series debuts
2012 British television series endings
Channel 4 game shows
E4 comedy
English-language television shows
Hidden camera television series
Television series by All3Media